Albania made its Paralympic Games debut at the 2012 Summer Paralympics in London, sending one representative to compete in cycling.

See also
 :Category:Paralympic competitors for Albania
 Albania at the Olympics

References